Ahlam Amrani (born ) is an Algerian volleyball player.

She participated with her club GS Petroliers at the 2014 FIVB Volleyball Women's Club World Championship.

References

External links
 profile at FIVB.org
http://www.scoresway.com/Janowicz-F-Mayer-ATP-Challenger-Prostejov?sport=volleyball&page=player&id=10261
https://web.archive.org/web/20170824011347/http://www.cavb.org/pagescom.php?option=pagedetail&id=367

1991 births
Living people
Algerian women's volleyball players
Place of birth missing (living people)
21st-century Algerian people